Adrian Victor "Adi" Birrell (born 8 December 1960) in Grahamstown, Cape Province is a South African cricket coach and former first class cricketer. A leg break bowler, Birrell took 75 wickets at 30.16 in his career for Eastern Province, before turning to coaching.

He was educated at St Andrew's College in Grahamstown.

He led Ireland in the 2007 ICC Cricket World Cup where they reached the Super Eight Stage. In the tournament they beat two Test nations, Bangladesh and Pakistan as well as achieving a tie against Zimbabwe. He stepped down after the World Cup and was replaced as Ireland coach by Phil Simmons, but he continued to coach in Ireland. In 2013 he was appointed assistant national coach for South Africa. On 14 December 2018, Birrell was appointed first team coach at Hampshire County Cricket Club.

References

External links
Adrian Birrell at Cricinfo
Adrian Birrell at CricketArchive
Matches and detailed statistics for Adrian Birrell

1960 births
Living people
South African cricket coaches
Eastern Province cricketers
South African cricketers
Coaches of the Irish national cricket team
South African expatriate sportspeople in Ireland
Alumni of St. Andrew's College, Grahamstown
People from Makhanda, Eastern Cape
Cricketers from the Eastern Cape